The Women's National Basketball Association Peak Performer Awards are given each year to players who lead the WNBA in scoring, rebounding, and assists. The award has been given since the league's inaugural season, but the honor has varied since then.

Peak Performers 

In 1997, the Peak Performers Awards went to the "shooting champions" from each conference.
From 1998 until 2002, the Peak Performers Awards went to players who had the best field goal and free throw percentage.
In 2007, since Lauren Jackson was the league leader in scoring and rebounds, the WNBA awarded Becky Hammon for leading the league in assists.
In 2007, the WNBA added the league leader in assists per game to the Peak Performers award.

See also

 List of sports awards honoring women

External links 
 (1997-2012)

References 

Awards established in 1997
Peak